Brunswick Dock railway station was on the Liverpool Overhead Railway, adjacent to Brunswick Dock and in close proximity to the Cheshire Lines Committee's extensive goods yard of the same name.

It was opened on 6 March 1893 by Robert Cecil, 3rd Marquess of Salisbury. The station had a hydraulic lift bridge which enabled a section of track to be lifted up to allow large vehicles to pass underneath. It was heavily bombed during the Liverpool Blitz.

The station closed, along with the rest of the line on 30 December 1956. No evidence of the station remains.

References

Sources

External links
 Brunswick Dock at Disused Stations

Disused railway stations in Liverpool
Former Liverpool Overhead Railway stations
Railway stations in Great Britain opened in 1893
Railway stations in Great Britain closed in 1956